Paolo Costoli (12 August 1910 – 28 January 1966) was an Italian freestyle swimmer who won six medals at the European championships in 1931 and 1934. He competed at the 1928 and 1932 Summer Olympics in four events in total, ranging from 200 to 1500 m, but failed to reach the finals.

He died in an aircraft crash in Bremen, Germany.

References

External links
 

1910 births
1966 deaths
European Aquatics Championships medalists in swimming
Italian male swimmers
Italian male freestyle swimmers
Olympic swimmers of Italy
Swimmers at the 1928 Summer Olympics
Swimmers at the 1932 Summer Olympics
Victims of aviation accidents or incidents in Germany
Victims of aviation accidents or incidents in 1966
20th-century Italian people